Hôtel Salomon de Rothschild is a hôtel particulier located at 11 rue Berryer in the 8th arrondissement in Paris, France. Designed by Leon Ohnet and constructed between 1872 and 1878, it is located in the heart of Paris, near the Rue du Faubourg Saint-Honoré.

On her death in 1922, the Jewish Adèle von Rothschild bequeathed the property to the French government fine arts administration rather than to her only child, Hélène de Rothschild, whom she had disinherited for marrying a Roman Catholic.

The hotel was the site of a presidential assassination on 6 May 1932.  French President Paul Doumer was at a book fair in the hotel when a mentally unstable Russian émigré, Paul Gorguloff, opened fire at him.  Doumer died the following morning.

Today the building is home to the Centre national de la photographie and its renowned garden is open to the public. The following cultural and socio-educational organizations currently are in the building:

 A.D.A.G.P (Ste des Auteurs Arts Graphiques et Plastiques)
 Foundation Albert Gleizes
 Foundation Nationale des Arts Graphiques Plastiques (F.N.A.G.P.)
 Les Amis de Nogent
 Maison des Artistes
 Société Nationale des Beaux Arts
 Syndicat National des Sculpteurs

External links 

 Images of the Hôtel Salomon de Rothschild on the website Structurae

Houses completed in 1878
Rothschild family residences
Salomon de Rothschild
Buildings and structures in the 8th arrondissement of Paris